Van der Horst is a Dutch toponymic surname. The original bearer of the name was from the horst, which is a historical indication of raised terrain covered with shrubs.
People with the name include:

 (1899-1965), Dutch organist and composer
Arnoldus Vanderhorst (1748-1815), American general and governor
Cornelius van der Horst (1889-1951) Dutch-South African biologist
Dimeo van der Horst (born 1991), Dutch basketball player
Elise van der Horst (born 1982), Dutch singer-songwriter known as EliZe
Etienne van der Horst (born 1958), Curaçaoan politician
Fredrik van der Horst (born 1989), Norwegian speed skater
Klaas van der Horst (1731-1825), Dutch Mennonite teacher and minister
Jan van der Horst (cyclist) (born 1942), Dutch racing cyclist
Jan van der Horst (rower) (born 1948), Dutch rower
Johannes van der Horst (1909-1992), Dutch modern pentathlete
John Vander Horst (1912–1990), American Episcopal bishop
Lutz van der Horst (born 1975), German actor and comedian
Martin van der Horst (born 1965), Dutch volleyball player
Michel van der Horst (born 1975), Dutch darts player
Piet van der Horst (1903–1983), Dutch racing cyclist
Pieter Willem van der Horst (born 1946), Dutch professor and scholar of early Christianity
Ria van der Horst (born 1932), Dutch swimmer
Robert van der Horst (born 1984), Dutch hockey player
Theo van der Horst (1921-2003), Dutch painter, sculptor, graphic artist and glass artist

See also
Ter Horst, Dutch surname of the same origin

References

Dutch-language surnames
Surnames of Dutch origin
Dutch toponymic surnames